Hogolua is a genus of air-breathing land snails, terrestrial pulmonate gastropod mollusks in the family Zonitidae. Some authors place this genus in the family Trochomorphidae instead.

This genus name has sometimes mistakenly been written as "Hongolua" and even "Hoglua".

Species
Species within the genus Hongolua include:
 Hogolua kondorum

References 

 Vagvolvyi, J. (1976), Body size, aerial dispersal and origin of the Pacific land snail fauna, Syst. Zool, 24, pp. 465–488
 Baker, 1941, Bulletin of the Bishop Museum, 116, 273

 
Gastropod genera
Taxonomy articles created by Polbot